French Flemish (French Flemish: , Standard Dutch:) is a West Flemish dialect spoken in the north of contemporary France. Place names attest to Flemish having been spoken since the 8th century in the part of Flanders that was ceded to France at the 1659 Treaty of the Pyrenees, and which hence became known as French Flanders. Its dialect subgroup, called French Flemish, meanwhile, became a minority dialect that survives mainly in Dunkirk ( in Dutch,  in West Flemish, "dune church"), Bourbourg ( in Dutch), Calais, Saint-Omer with an ethnic enclave Haut-Pont (Haute-Ponte) known for its predominantly Flemish community and Bailleul. French-Flemish has about 20,000 daily users, and twice that number of occasional speakers. The language's status appears to be moribund, but there has been an active movement to retain French Flemish in the region.

Education 
A growing, re-introduced language, French Flemish is taught in several schools in the French Westhoek. The ANVT-ILRF was given permission to carry out experimental lessons in four public schools (in Esquelbecq, Noordpeene, Volckerinckhove, Wormhout) for the school years of 2007–08 until 2010–11, after which it would be evaluated. Afterwards, all requirements were met but it was only allowed to continue them, but not to expand to other schools or to the collège. On the other hand, the private Catholic education began teaching standard Dutch in collèges in Gravelines and Hondschoote.

Status
Though generally seen as a dialect of Dutch, some of its speakers prefer to call it a regional language. Jean-Paul Couché, chairman of the Akademie voor Nuuze Vlaemsche Taele (ANVT), argues:
Linguistically, a dialect depends on a larger, national language. That does not apply to French Flemish. We are not connected to standard Dutch because it is an artificial language that was created based on the dialects of North Holland. Research shows that the distance between French Flemish and Dutch is greater than that between Dutch and German.Although French Flemish and West Flemish are together with Limburgish and Gronings the most distant dialects from Standard Dutch, Standard Dutch and Standard German are more distant still. However, that is not the case for Dutch and German dialects spoken at both sides of the Dutch-German border.

See also
 Burgundian Netherlands
 French Flanders
 French Netherlands
 Isogloss
 Nord-Pas de Calais
 Seventeen Provinces

Footnotes

External links
Akademie voor Nuuze Vlaemsche Taele tries to regulate this language
Flemish in France site UOC, Universitat Oberta de Catalunya (Open University of Catalonia), subsite Euromosaic – Research Centre of Multilingualism.
fvlinhetnederlands.actieforum.com

Languages of France
Ethnic groups in France
Dutch language
Dutch dialects
Endangered Germanic languages